Daphny van den Brand, (born 6 April 1978 in Zeeland, North Brabant) is a Dutch cyclo-cross, road bicycle and mountain bike racer.

Daphny van den Brand started her cycling at eight. She won races thanks to her sprint.

Van den Brand joined the Dutch junior team. She won her first medal as a junior in 1993 during the cyclo-cross race in Sint-Michielsgestel, where she finished third .

Dutch mountain bike manager Leo van Zeeland asked her in 1994 to race on a mountain bike. Van den Brand took part in a race in Bergschenhoek and finished in fifth position. She rode the European and world junior mountain biking championships and finished seventh in both.

Van den Brand then concentrated on mountain biking and cyclo-cross. She won eight national cyclo-cross championships and the cyclo-cross world championship in 2003 in Monopoli. She also won four world bronze medals, a silver at the European championship in 2005 and gold at the 2006 UCI Cyclo-cross European Championships. In mountain biking she won a gold, a silver and a bronze medal in national championships between 2001 and 2003.

Achievements

1994
 3rd in National championship cyclo-cross
1997
 1st in Gieten
1998
 1st in  National championship cyclo-cross
 1st in Gieten
1999
 1st in  National championship cyclo-cross
 1st in Gieten
2000
 3rd in World Championship Cyclo-cross
 1st in  National championship cyclo-cross
 1st in Gieten
2001
 3rd in World Championship Cyclo-cross
 1st in  National championship cyclo-cross
 1st in Gieten
2002
 2nd in Dutch National Championship Mountain bike
 3rd in World Championship Cyclo-cross
 1st in  National championship cyclo-cross
 1st in Hoogerheide
2003
 3rd in Dutch National Championship Mountain bike
 1st in  World Championship Cyclo-cross in Monopoli
 1st in  National championship cyclo-cross
 1st in Hoogerheide
 1st in Torino
 1st in Vossem
 1st in Kalmthout
2004
 2nd in National championship cyclo-cross
 1st in  National championship mountain bike
 1st in Oostmalle
 1st in Pijnacker-Nootdorp
 1st in Milan
 1st in Kalmthout
 1st in Overijse
 1st in Loenhout
2005
 1st in  National championship cyclo-cross
 1st in Hamburg
 1st in Kalmthout
 1st in Sint-Michielsgestel
 1st in Koppenberg
 2nd in UCI cyclo-cross European championship in Pont-Chateau
 1st in Pijnacker-Nootdorp
 1st in Milan
 1st in Hofstade
 1st in Hooglede
2006
 1st in 2006 UCI Cyclo-cross European Championships
 1st in  National championship cyclo-cross
 1st in Liévin
 1st in Hoogerheide
 3rd in World championship cyclo-cross
 1st in Oostmalle
 1st in Harderwijk
 1st in Frankfurt
 1st in Overijse
 1st in Veghel-Eerde
2007
 1st in 2007 UCI cyclo-cross European championship
 1st in  National championship cyclo-cross
2009
 2nd in UCI Cyclo-cross World Cup, Treviso (ITA)

External links

Official Daphny van den Brand website
Video of Daphny in Oostmalle

1978 births
Living people
Cross-country mountain bikers
Cyclo-cross cyclists
Dutch female cyclists
Dutch mountain bikers
People from Landerd
UCI Cyclo-cross World Champions (women)
Cyclists from North Brabant
20th-century Dutch women
21st-century Dutch women